Acacia amoena, commonly known as boomerang wattle, is a shrub belonging to the genus Acacia and the subgenus Phyllodineae that is native to parts of eastern Australia.

Description
It blooms between July and December and produces inflorescences with bright to pale yellow flowers. The spherical flower heads contain six to twelve bright golden flower with dark brown bracteoles.

Taxonomy
The species was first formally described by the botanist Heinrich Wendland in 1820 as part of the work Commentatio de Acaciis aphyllis. It is also often confused with Acacia rubida The species belongs to the Acacia microbotrya group and is closely related to Acacia kydrensis and similar to Acacia chalkeri and Acacia rubida.

Distribution
It is found along the Great Dividing Range in western parts of New South Wales, Queensland and Victoria where it is often a part of dry sclerophyll forest or open woodland communities on rocky slopes and creek banks growing in rocky soils.
The bulk of the population has a discontinuous distribution from around Walcha in the north down to the upper reaches of the Snowy River north-eastern Victoria.

See also
List of Acacia species

References

amoena
Flora of New South Wales
Flora of Queensland
Flora of Victoria (Australia)
Plants described in 1820
Taxa named by Heinrich Wendland